Joseph Clark (4 July 18344 July 1926) was an English oil painter, well known in the Victorian era for his domestic scenes, especially of children.

Life

Born in 1834 in Cerne Abbas, Dorset, from the age of eleven Clark was educated as a boarder by William Barnes at his school in Dorchester, and according to a study of the school "exploited Barnes's training perhaps more successfully than any other pupil".

His parents brought Clark up as a member of the Swedenborgian New Church, and he remained a member all his life. By 1851, Clark's father had died, and he was living at 13, Long Street, Cerne Abbas, with his widowed mother, who was a retired draper, and two older unmarried sisters, Mary and Emma. He went on to train at J. M. Leigh's art school and became a successful artist at an early age, exhibiting at the Royal Academy between 1857 and 1904. Victorian Painters sums him up as a "painter of domestic genre of a tender and affecting nature, usually of children and a few biblical subjects". He was elected a Member of the Institute of Oil Painters, which had a membership limited to one hundred. Some of his paintings were named in the Dorset dialect, in which his schoolmaster William Barnes wrote poetry. "Jeanes Wedden Day in Mornen", which is also the title of a poem  by Barnes, is an example of this.

In 1868, at Winchester, Clark married Annie Jones, a daughter of John Jones, of Winchester, and they went on to have one son and three daughters. He was also the uncle of another artist, Joseph Benwell Clark.

Clark died at 95 Hereson Road, Ramsgate,  Kent, on 4 July 1926, his 92nd birthday.

Notes

References

Further reading
 Eric Galvin, Joseph Clark: A Popular Victorian Artist and his World (Portway Publishing, 2016)

External links

Joseph Clark (British, 1834–1926) at Artnet
"Joseph Clark (1834–1926) Artist in Oils" at Dorset Ancestors

19th-century English painters
20th-century English painters
1834 births
1926 deaths
Alumni of the Heatherley School of Fine Art
English illustrators
People from West Dorset District